Shaking beef or beef lok lak is a French-inspired Vietnamese dish that consists of beef sauteed with cucumber, lettuce, tomatoes, red onion, pepper, and soy sauce. The beef is cut into small cubes the size of playing dice (hột lúc lắc) before being sauteed. Beef used to be a luxury ingredient, therefore the dish was mostly served at formal events, such as wedding banquets and anniversaries, however nowadays, it has become a common food. Before French colonization cows were only used for manual labour and were working animals.

In Cambodia, shaking beef is known as beef lok lak and often considered a national dish. It could have entered Cambodian cuisine after the Vietnamese annexation of Cambodia in 1834 or during the French Indochina period. The original lok lak uses high-quality steak fried with French butter which stems from Indochina's French colonial past, while a simpler version influenced by Chinese culinary techniques uses cheap cuts of beef and Chinese oyster sauce.

See also 
 Lomo saltado, a beef stir-fry of the chifa (Chinese-Peruvian cuisine) tradition.

References

External links 

 Chef Nite Yun prepares black pepper beef in an electric induction wok. 6 May 2021. East Bay Community Energy via YouTube

Cambodian cuisine
Vietnamese beef dishes
French fusion cuisine